Family Reunion is a 1981 American made-for-television drama film directed by Fielder Cook. The teleplay by Allan Sloane was based on the Ladies Home Journal article How America Lives by Joe Sparton. It was produced by Columbia Pictures Television for NBC, which aired it in two parts on October 11 and 12, 1981.

Plot
Family Reunion follows Elizabeth Winfield, a New England teacher recently retired after a fifty-year career. She uses an unlimited bus ticket received as a gift to visit the distant members of her long-estranged family. During her absence, her small hometown, which bears her family's name, falls prey to dishonest relatives colluding with corrupt shopping mall developers. She returns in an effort to halt construction on the project and, armed with the moral integrity she has instilled in her students for the past five decades, she manages to resolve the situation in time for the annual Founder's Day festivities.

Cast
 Bette Davis as Elizabeth Winfield
 J. Ashley Hyman as Richard Cooper
 David Huddleston as Chester Winfield
 John Shea as James Cookman
 Roy Dotrice as Luther Frye
 Roberts Blossom as Phil King
 Kathryn Walker as Louisa King 
 David Rounds as Grover Winfield 
 Roberta Wallach as Jessica Winfield 
 Jeff McCracken as Max Winfield
 Beth Ehlers as Janice Lyman
 Paul Rudd as Lane Lyman

External links
 

1981 television films
1981 films
1981 drama films
Films about families
NBC original programming
Films directed by Fielder Cook
American drama television films
1980s American films
1980s English-language films
English-language drama films